Graffiti (plural; singular graffiti or graffito, the latter rarely used except in archeology) is art that is written, painted or drawn on a wall or other surface, usually without permission and within public view. Graffiti ranges from simple written words to elaborate wall paintings, and has existed since ancient times, with examples dating back to ancient Egypt, ancient Greece, and the Roman Empire (see also mural).

Graffiti is a controversial subject. In most countries, marking or painting property without permission is considered by property owners and civic authorities as defacement and vandalism, which is a punishable crime, citing the use of graffiti by street gangs to mark territory or to serve as an indicator of gang-related activities. Graffiti has become visualized as a growing urban "problem" for many cities in industrialized nations, spreading from the New York City subway system and Philadelphia in the early 1970s to the rest of the United States and Europe and other world regions.

Etymology 

"Graffiti" (usually both singular and plural) and the rare singular form "graffito" are from the Italian word graffiato ("scratched"). The term "graffiti" is used in art history for works of art produced by scratching a design into a surface. A related term is "sgraffito", which involves scratching through one layer of pigment to reveal another beneath it. This technique was primarily used by potters who would glaze their wares and then scratch a design into it. In ancient times graffiti were carved on walls with a sharp object, although sometimes chalk or coal were used. The word originates from Greek —graphein—meaning "to write".

History 

 

The term graffiti originally referred to the inscriptions, figure drawings, and such, found on the walls of ancient sepulchres or ruins, as in the Catacombs of Rome or at Pompeii. Use of the word has evolved to include any graphics applied to surfaces in a manner that constitutes vandalism.

The only known source of the Safaitic language, an ancient form of Arabic, is from graffiti: inscriptions scratched on to the surface of rocks and boulders in the predominantly basalt desert of southern Syria, eastern Jordan and northern Saudi Arabia. Safaitic dates from the first century BC to the fourth century AD.

Modern-style graffiti 

The first known example of "modern style" graffiti survives in the ancient Greek city of Ephesus (in modern-day Turkey). Local guides say it is an advertisement for prostitution. Located near a mosaic and stone walkway, the graffiti shows a handprint that vaguely resembles a heart, along with a footprint, a number, and a carved image of a woman's head.

The ancient Romans carved graffiti on walls and monuments, examples of which also survive in Egypt. Graffiti in the classical world had different connotations than they carry in today's society concerning content. Ancient graffiti displayed phrases of love declarations, political rhetoric, and simple words of thought, compared to today's popular messages of social and political ideals.
The eruption of Vesuvius preserved graffiti in Pompeii, which includes Latin curses, magic spells, declarations of love, insults, alphabets, political slogans, and famous literary quotes, providing insight into ancient Roman street life. One inscription gives the address of a woman named Novellia Primigenia of Nuceria, a prostitute, apparently of great beauty, whose services were much in demand. Another shows a phallus accompanied by the text, mansueta tene ("handle with care").

Disappointed love also found its way onto walls in antiquity:

Ancient tourists visiting the 5th-century citadel at Sigiriya in Sri Lanka scribbled over 1800 individual graffiti there between the 6th and 18th centuries. Etched on the surface of the Mirror Wall, they contain pieces of prose, poetry, and commentary. The majority of these visitors appear to have been from the elite of society: royalty, officials, professions, and clergy. There were also soldiers, archers, and even some metalworkers. The topics range from love to satire, curses, wit, and lament. Many demonstrate a very high level of literacy and a deep appreciation of art and poetry. Most of the graffiti refer to the frescoes of semi-nude females found there. One reads:

Among the ancient political graffiti examples were Arab satirist poems. Yazid al-Himyari, an Umayyad Arab and Persian poet, was most known for writing his political poetry on the walls between Sajistan and Basra, manifesting a strong hatred towards the Umayyad regime and its walis, and people used to read and circulate them very widely.

Level of literacy often evident in graffiti 

Historic forms of graffiti have helped gain understanding into the lifestyles and languages of past cultures. Errors in spelling and grammar in these graffiti offer insight into the degree of literacy in Roman times and provide clues on the pronunciation of spoken Latin. Examples are CIL IV, 7838: Vettium Firmum / aed[ilem] quactiliar[ii]  rog[ant]. Here, "qu" is pronounced "co". The 83 pieces of graffiti found at CIL IV, 4706-85 are evidence of the ability to read and write at levels of society where literacy might not be expected. The graffiti appear on a peristyle which was being remodeled at the time of the eruption of Vesuvius by the architect Crescens. The graffiti were left by both the foreman and his workers. The brothel at CIL VII, 12, 18–20 contains more than 120 pieces of graffiti, some of which were the work of the prostitutes and their clients. The gladiatorial academy at CIL IV, 4397 was scrawled with graffiti left by the gladiator Celadus Crescens (Suspirium puellarum Celadus thraex: "Celadus the Thracian makes the girls sigh.")

Another piece from Pompeii, written on a tavern wall about the owner of the establishment and his questionable wine:

It was not only the Greeks and Romans who produced graffiti: the Maya site of Tikal in Guatemala contains examples of ancient Maya graffiti. Viking graffiti survive in Rome and at Newgrange Mound in Ireland, and a Varangian scratched his name (Halvdan) in runes on a banister in the Hagia Sophia at Constantinople. These early forms of graffiti have contributed to the understanding of lifestyles and languages of past cultures.

Graffiti, known as Tacherons, were frequently scratched on Romanesque Scandinavian church walls.
When Renaissance artists such as Pinturicchio, Raphael, Michelangelo, Ghirlandaio, or Filippino Lippi descended into the ruins of Nero's Domus Aurea, they carved or painted their names and returned to initiate the grottesche style of decoration.

There are also examples of graffiti occurring in American history, such as Independence Rock, a national landmark along the Oregon Trail.

Later, French soldiers carved their names on monuments during the Napoleonic campaign of Egypt in the 1790s. Lord Byron's survives on one of the columns of the Temple of Poseidon at Cape Sounion in Attica, Greece.

Contemporary graffiti 

Contemporary graffiti style has been heavily influenced by hip hop culture and the myriad international styles derived from Philadelphia and New York City Subway graffiti, however, there are many other traditions of notable graffiti in the twentieth century. Graffiti have long appeared on building walls, in latrines, railroad boxcars, subways, and bridges.

The oldest known example of modern graffiti are the "monikers" found on traincars created by hobos and railworkers since the late 1800s. The Bozo Texino monikers were documented by filmmaker Bill Daniel in his 2005 film, Who is Bozo Texino?.

Some graffiti have their own poignancy. In World War II, an inscription on a wall at the fortress of Verdun was seen as an illustration of the US response twice in a generation to the wrongs of the Old World:

During World War II and for decades after, the phrase "Kilroy was here" with an accompanying illustration was widespread throughout the world, due to its use by American troops and ultimately filtering into American popular culture. Shortly after the death of Charlie Parker (nicknamed "Yardbird" or "Bird"), graffiti began appearing around New York with the words "Bird Lives". The student protests and general strike of May 1968 saw Paris bedecked in revolutionary, anarchistic, and situationist slogans such as L'ennui est contre-révolutionnaire ("Boredom is counterrevolutionary") expressed in painted graffiti, poster art, and stencil art. At the time in the US, other political phrases (such as "Free Huey" about Black Panther Huey Newton) became briefly popular as graffiti in limited areas, only to be forgotten. A popular graffito of the early 1970s was "Dick Nixon Before He Dicks You", reflecting the hostility of the youth culture to that US president.

Advent of aerosol paint 

Rock and roll graffiti is a significant subgenre. A famous graffito of the twentieth century was the inscription in London reading "Clapton is God" in reference to the guitarist Eric Clapton. Creating the cult of the guitar hero, the phrase was spray-painted by an admirer on a wall in an Islington, north London in the autumn of 1967. The graffito was captured in a photograph, in which a dog is urinating on the wall.

Graffiti also became associated with the anti-establishment punk rock movement beginning in the 1970s. Bands such as Black Flag and Crass (and their followers) widely stenciled their names and logos, while many punk night clubs, squats, and hangouts are famous for their graffiti.

Spread of hip hop culture 

Style Wars depicted not only famous graffitists such as Skeme, Dondi, MinOne, and ZEPHYR, but also reinforced graffiti's role within New York's emerging hip-hop culture by incorporating famous early break-dancing groups such as Rock Steady Crew into the film and featuring rap in the soundtrack. Although many officers of the New York City Police Department found this film to be controversial, Style Wars is still recognized as the most prolific film representation of what was going on within the young hip hop culture of the early 1980s. Fab5 Freddy and Futura 2000 took hip hop graffiti to Paris and London as part of the New York City Rap Tour in 1983.

Stencil graffiti emerges 

This period also saw the emergence of the new stencil graffiti genre. Some of the first examples were created in 1981 by graffitists Blek le Rat in Paris, in 1982 by Jef Aerosol in Tours (France); by 1985 stencils had appeared in other cities including New York City, Sydney, and Melbourne, where they were documented by American photographer Charles Gatewood and Australian photographer Rennie Ellis.

Commercialization and entrance into mainstream pop culture 

With the popularity and legitimization of graffiti has come a level of commercialization. In 2001, computer giant IBM launched an advertising campaign in Chicago and San Francisco which involved people spray painting on sidewalks a peace symbol, a heart, and a penguin (Linux mascot), to represent "Peace, Love, and Linux." IBM paid Chicago and San Francisco collectively US$120,000 for punitive damages and clean-up costs.

In 2005, a similar ad campaign was launched by Sony and executed by its advertising agency in New York, Chicago, Atlanta, Philadelphia, Los Angeles, and Miami, to market its handheld PSP gaming system. In this campaign, taking notice of the legal problems of the IBM campaign, Sony paid building owners for the rights to paint on their buildings "a collection of dizzy-eyed urban kids playing with the PSP as if it were a skateboard, a paddle, or a rocking horse".

Advocates 

Marc Ecko, an urban clothing designer, has been an advocate of graffiti as an art form during this period, stating that "Graffiti is without question the most powerful art movement in recent history and has been a driving inspiration throughout my career."

Graffiti have become a common stepping stone for many members of both the art and design communities in North America and abroad. Within the United States graffitists such as Mike Giant, Pursue, Rime, Noah, and countless others have made careers in skateboard, apparel, and shoe design for companies such as DC Shoes, Adidas, Rebel8, Osiris, or Circa Meanwhile, there are many others such as DZINE, Daze, Blade, and The Mac who have made the switch to being gallery artists, often not even using their initial medium, spray paint.

Global developments

South America 

Tristan Manco wrote that Brazil "boasts a unique and particularly rich, graffiti scene ... [earning] it an international reputation as the place to go for artistic inspiration." Graffiti "flourishes in every conceivable space in Brazil's cities." Artistic parallels "are often drawn between the energy of São Paulo today and 1970s New York." The "sprawling metropolis," of São Paulo has "become the new shrine to graffiti;" Manco alludes to "poverty and unemployment ... [and] the epic struggles and conditions of the country's marginalised peoples," and to "Brazil's chronic poverty," as the main engines that "have fuelled a vibrant graffiti culture." In world terms, Brazil has "one of the most uneven distributions of income. Laws and taxes change frequently." Such factors, Manco argues, contribute to a very fluid society, riven with those economic divisions and social tensions that underpin and feed the "folkloric vandalism and an urban sport for the disenfranchised," that is South American graffiti art.

Prominent Brazilian graffitists include Os Gêmeos, Boleta, Nunca, Nina, Speto, Tikka, and T.Freak. Their artistic success and involvement in commercial design ventures has highlighted divisions within the Brazilian graffiti community between adherents of the cruder transgressive form of pichação and the more conventionally artistic values of the practitioners of grafite.

Middle East 

Graffiti in the Middle East has emerged slowly, with taggers operating in Egypt, Lebanon, the Gulf countries like Bahrein or the United Arab Emirates, Israel, and in Iran. The major Iranian newspaper Hamshahri has published two articles on illegal writers in the city with photographic coverage of Iranian artist A1one's works on Tehran walls. Tokyo-based design magazine, PingMag, has interviewed A1one and featured photographs of his work. The Israeli West Bank barrier has become a site for graffiti, reminiscent in this sense of the Berlin Wall. Many graffitists in Israel come from other places around the globe, such as JUIF from Los Angeles and DEVIONE from London. The religious reference "נ נח נחמ נחמן מאומן" ("Na Nach Nachma Nachman Meuman") is commonly seen in graffiti around Israel.

Graffiti has played an important role within the street art scene in the Middle East and North Africa (MENA), especially following the events of the Arab Spring of 2011 or the Sudanese Revolution of 2018/19. Graffiti is a tool of expression in the context of conflict in the region, allowing people to raise their voices politically and socially. Famous street artist Banksy has had an important effect in the street art scene in the MENA area, especially in Palestine where some of his works are located in the West Bank barrier and Bethlehem.

Southeast Asia 

There are also a large number of graffiti influences in Southeast Asian countries that mostly come from modern Western culture, such as Malaysia, where graffiti have long been a common sight in Malaysia's capital city, Kuala Lumpur. Since 2010, the country has begun hosting a street festival to encourage all generations and people from all walks of life to enjoy and encourage Malaysian street culture.

Characteristics of common graffiti

Methods and production 

The modern-day graffitists can be found with an arsenal of various materials that allow for a successful production of a piece. This includes such techniques as scribing. However, spray paint in aerosol cans is the number one medium for graffiti. From this commodity comes different styles, technique, and abilities to form master works of graffiti. Spray paint can be found at hardware and art stores and comes in virtually every color.

Stencil graffiti is created by cutting out shapes and designs in a stiff material (such as cardboard or subject folders) to form an overall design or image. The stencil is then placed on the "canvas" gently and with quick, easy strokes of the aerosol can, the image begins to appear on the intended surface.

Modern experimentation 

Modern graffiti art often incorporates additional arts and technologies. For example, Graffiti Research Lab has encouraged the use of projected images and magnetic light-emitting diodes (throwies) as new media for graffitists. Yarnbombing is another recent form of graffiti. Yarnbombers occasionally target previous graffiti for modification, which had been avoided among the majority of graffitists.

Tagging 

Tagging is the practice of someone spray-painting "their name, initial or logo onto a public surface".
A number of recent examples of graffiti make use of hashtags.

Uses 

Theories on the use of graffiti by avant-garde artists have a history dating back at least to the Asger Jorn, who in 1962 painting declared in a graffiti-like gesture "the avant-garde won't give up".

Many contemporary analysts and even art critics have begun to see artistic value in some graffiti and to recognize it as a form of public art. According to many art researchers, particularly in the Netherlands and in Los Angeles, that type of public art is, in fact an effective tool of social emancipation or, in the achievement of a political goal.

In times of conflict, such murals have offered a means of communication and self-expression for members of these socially, ethnically, or racially divided communities, and have proven themselves as effective tools in establishing dialog and thus, of addressing cleavages in the long run. The Berlin Wall was also extensively covered by graffiti reflecting social pressures relating to the oppressive Soviet rule over the GDR.

Many artists involved with graffiti are also concerned with the similar activity of stenciling. Essentially, this entails stenciling a print of one or more colors using spray-paint. Recognized while exhibiting and publishing several of her coloured stencils and paintings portraying the Sri Lankan Civil War and urban Britain in the early 2000s, graffitists Mathangi Arulpragasam, aka M.I.A., has also become known for integrating her imagery of political violence into her music videos for singles "Galang" and "Bucky Done Gun", and her cover art. Stickers of her artwork also often appear around places such as London in Brick Lane, stuck to lamp posts and street signs, she having become a muse for other graffitists and painters worldwide in cities including Seville.

Personal expression 

Many graffitists choose to protect their identities and remain anonymous or to hinder prosecution.

With the commercialization of graffiti (and hip hop in general), in most cases, even with legally painted "graffiti" art, graffitists tend to choose anonymity. This may be attributed to various reasons or a combination of reasons. Graffiti still remains the one of four hip hop elements that is not considered "performance art" despite the image of the "singing and dancing star" that sells hip hop culture to the mainstream. Being a graphic form of art, it might also be said that many graffitists still fall in the category of the introverted archetypal artist.

Banksy is one of the world's most notorious and popular street artists who continues to remain faceless in today's society. He is known for his political, anti-war stencil art mainly in Bristol, England, but his work may be seen anywhere from Los Angeles to Palestine. In the UK, Banksy is the most recognizable icon for this cultural artistic movement and keeps his identity a secret to avoid arrest. Much of Banksy's artwork may be seen around the streets of London and surrounding suburbs, although he has painted pictures throughout the world, including the Middle East, where he has painted on Israel's controversial West Bank barrier with satirical images of life on the other side. One depicted a hole in the wall with an idyllic beach, while another shows a mountain landscape on the other side. A number of exhibitions also have taken place since 2000, and recent works of art have fetched vast sums of money. Banksy's art is a prime example of the classic controversy: vandalism vs. art. Art supporters endorse his work distributed in urban areas as pieces of art and some councils, such as Bristol and Islington, have officially protected them, while officials of other areas have deemed his work to be vandalism and have removed it.

Pixnit is another artist who chooses to keep her identity from the general public. Her work focuses on beauty and design aspects of graffiti as opposed to Banksy's anti-government shock value. Her paintings are often of flower designs above shops and stores in her local urban area of Cambridge, Massachusetts. Some store owners endorse her work and encourage others to do similar work as well. "One of the pieces was left up above Steve's Kitchen, because it looks pretty awesome"- Erin Scott, the manager of New England Comics in Allston, Massachusetts.

Graffiti artists may become offended if photographs of their art are published in a commercial context without their permission. In March 2020, the Finnish graffiti artist Psyke expressed his displeasure at the newspaper Ilta-Sanomat publishing a photograph of a Peugeot 208 in an article about new cars, with his graffiti prominently shown on the background. The artist claims he does not want his art being used in commercial context, not even if he were to receive compensation.

Territorial 
Territorial graffiti marks urban neighborhoods with tags and logos to differentiate certain groups from others. These images are meant to show outsiders a stern look at whose turf is whose. The subject matter of gang-related graffiti consists of cryptic symbols and initials strictly fashioned with unique calligraphies. Gang members use graffiti to designate membership throughout the gang, to differentiate rivals and associates and, most commonly, to mark borders which are both territorial and ideological.

As advertising 

Graffiti has been used as a means of advertising both legally and illegally. Bronx-based TATS CRU has made a name for themselves doing legal advertising campaigns for companies such as Coca-Cola, McDonald's, Toyota, and MTV. In the UK, Covent Garden's Boxfresh used stencil images of a Zapatista revolutionary in the hopes that cross referencing would promote their store.

Smirnoff hired artists to use reverse graffiti (the use of high pressure hoses to clean dirty surfaces to leave a clean image in the surrounding dirt) to increase awareness of their product.

Radical and political 

Graffiti often has a reputation as part of a subculture that rebels against authority, although the considerations of the practitioners often diverge and can relate to a wide range of attitudes. It can express a political practice and can form just one tool in an array of resistance techniques. One early example includes the anarcho-punk band Crass, who conducted a campaign of stenciling anti-war, anarchist, feminist, and anti-consumerist messages throughout the London Underground system during the late 1970s and early 1980s. In Amsterdam graffiti was a major part of the punk scene. The city was covered with names such as "De Zoot", "Vendex", and "Dr Rat". To document the graffiti a punk magazine was started that was called Gallery Anus. So when hip hop came to Europe in the early 1980s there was already a vibrant graffiti culture.

The student protests and general strike of May 1968 saw Paris bedecked in revolutionary, anarchistic, and situationist slogans such as L'ennui est contre-révolutionnaire ("Boredom is counterrevolutionary") and Lisez moins, vivez plus ("Read less, live more"). While not exhaustive, the graffiti gave a sense of the 'millenarian' and rebellious spirit, tempered with a good deal of verbal wit, of the strikers.

The developments of graffiti art which took place in art galleries and colleges as well as "on the street" or "underground", contributed to the resurfacing in the 1990s of a far more overtly politicized art form in the subvertising, culture jamming, or tactical media movements. These movements or styles tend to classify the artists by their relationship to their social and economic contexts, since, in most countries, graffiti art remains illegal in many forms except when using non-permanent paint. Since the 1990s with the rise of Street Art, a growing number of artists are switching to non-permanent paints and non-traditional forms of painting.

Contemporary practitioners, accordingly, have varied and often conflicting practices. Some individuals, such as Alexander Brener, have used the medium to politicize other art forms, and have used the prison sentences enforced on them as a means of further protest.
The practices of anonymous groups and individuals also vary widely, and practitioners by no means always agree with each other's practices. For example, the anti-capitalist art group the Space Hijackers did a piece in 2004 about the contradiction between the capitalistic elements of Banksy and his use of political imagery.

Berlin human rights activist Irmela Mensah-Schramm has received global media attention and numerous awards for her 35-year campaign of effacing neo-Nazi and other right-wing extremist graffiti throughout Germany, often by altering hate speech in humorous ways.

Genocide denial 
In Serbian capital, Belgrade, the graffiti depicting a uniformed former general of Serb army and war criminal, convicted at ICTY for war crimes and crimes against humanity, including genocide and ethnic cleansing in Bosnian War, Ratko Mladić, appeared in a military salute alongside the words, "General, thank to your mother". 
Aleks Eror, Berlin-based journalist, explains how "veneration of historical and wartime figures" through street art is not a new phenomenon in the region of former Yugoslavia, and that "in most cases is firmly focused on the future, rather than retelling the past". Eror is not only analyst pointing to danger of such an expressions for the region's future. In a long expose on the subject of Bosnian genocide denial, at Balkan Diskurs magazine and multimedia platform website, Kristina Gadže and Taylor Whitsell referred to these experiences as a young generations' "cultural heritage", in which young are being exposed to celebration and affirmation of war-criminals as part of their "formal education" and "inheritance".

There are numerous examples of genocide denial through celebration and affirmation of war criminals throughout the region of Western Balkans inhabited by Serbs using this form of artistic expression. Several more of these graffiti are found in Serbian capital, and many more across Serbia and Bosnian and Herzegovinian administrative entity,  Republika Srpska, which is the ethnic Serbian majority enclave. Critics point that Serbia as a state, is willing to defend the mural of convicted war criminal, and have no intention to react on cases of genocide denial, noting that Interior Minister of Serbia, Aleksandar Vulin decision to ban any gathering with an intent to remove the mural, with the deployment of riot police, sends the message of "tacit endorsement". Consequently, on 9 November 2021, Serbian heavy police in riot gear, with graffiti creators and their supporters, blocked the access to the mural to prevent human rights groups and other activists to paint over it and mark the International Day Against Fascism and Antisemitism in that way, and even arrested two civic activist for throwing eggs at the graffiti.

Offensive graffiti 

Graffiti may also be used as an offensive expression. This form of graffiti may be difficult to identify, as it is mostly removed by the local authority (as councils which have adopted strategies of criminalization also strive to remove graffiti quickly). Therefore, existing racist graffiti is mostly more subtle and at first sight, not easily recognized as "racist". It can then be understood only if one knows the relevant "local code" (social, historical, political, temporal, and spatial), which is seen as heteroglot and thus a 'unique set of conditions' in a cultural context.
A spatial code for example, could be that there is a certain youth group in an area that is engaging heavily in racist activities. So, for residents (knowing the local code), a graffiti containing only the name or abbreviation of this gang already is a racist expression, reminding the offended people of their gang activities. Also a graffiti is in most cases, the herald of more serious criminal activity to come. A person who does not know these gang activities would not be able to recognize the meaning of this graffiti. Also if a tag of this youth group or gang is placed on a building occupied by asylum seekers, for example, its racist character is even stronger.

By making the graffiti less explicit (as adapted to social and legal constraints), these drawings are less likely to be removed, but do not lose their threatening and offensive character.

Elsewhere, activists in Russia have used painted caricatures of local officials with their mouths as potholes, to show their anger about the poor state of the roads. In Manchester, England a graffitists painted obscene images around potholes, which often resulted in them being repaired within 48 hours.

Decorative and high art 

In the early 1980s, the first art galleries to show graffitists to the public were Fashion Moda in the Bronx, Now Gallery and Fun Gallery, both in the East Village, Manhattan.

A 2006 exhibition at the Brooklyn Museum displayed graffiti as an art form that began in New York's outer boroughs and reached great heights in the early 1980s with the work of Crash, Lee, Daze, Keith Haring, and Jean-Michel Basquiat. It displayed 22 works by New York graffitists, including Crash, Daze, and Lady Pink. In an article about the exhibition in the magazine Time Out, curator Charlotta Kotik said that she hoped the exhibition would cause viewers to rethink their assumptions about graffiti.

From the 1970s onwards, Burhan Dogancay photographed urban walls all over the world; these he then archived for use as sources of inspiration for his painterly works. The project today known as "Walls of the World" grew beyond even his own expectations and comprises about 30,000 individual images. It spans a period of 40 years across five continents and 114 countries. In 1982, photographs from this project comprised a one-man exhibition titled "Les murs murmurent, ils crient, ils chantent..." (The walls whisper, shout and sing...) at the Centre Georges Pompidou in Paris.

In Australia, art historians have judged some local graffiti of sufficient creative merit to rank them firmly within the arts. Oxford University Press's art history text Australian Painting 1788–2000 concludes with a long discussion of graffiti's key place within contemporary visual culture, including the work of several Australian practitioners.

Between March and April 2009, 150 artists exhibited 300 pieces of graffiti at the Grand Palais in Paris.

Environmental effects 

Spray paint has many negative environmental effects. The paint contains toxic chemicals, and the can uses volatile hydrocarbon gases to spray the paint onto a surface.

Volatile organic compound (VOC) leads to ground level ozone formation and most of graffiti related emissions are VOCs. A 2010 paper estimates 4,862 tons of VOCs were released in the United States in activities related to graffiti.

Government responses

Asia 

In China, Mao Zedong in the 1920s used revolutionary slogans and paintings in public places to galvanise the country's communist revolution.

Based on different national conditions, many people believe that China's attitude towards Graffiti is fierce, but in fact, according to Lance Crayon in his film Spray Paint Beijing: Graffiti in the Capital of China, Graffiti is generally accepted in Beijing, with artists not seeing much police interference. Political and religiously sensitive graffiti, however, is not allowed.

In Hong Kong, Tsang Tsou Choi was known as the King of Kowloon for his calligraphy graffiti over many years, in which he claimed ownership of the area. Now some of his work is preserved officially.

In Taiwan, the government has made some concessions to graffitists. Since 2005 they have been allowed to freely display their work along some sections of riverside retaining walls in designated "Graffiti Zones". From 2007, Taipei's department of cultural affairs also began permitting graffiti on fences around major public construction sites. Department head Yong-ping Lee (李永萍) stated, "We will promote graffiti starting with the public sector, and then later in the private sector too. It's our goal to beautify the city with graffiti". The government later helped organize a graffiti contest in Ximending, a popular shopping district. graffitists caught working outside of these designated areas still face fines up to NT$6,000 under a department of environmental protection regulation. However, Taiwanese authorities can be relatively lenient, one veteran police officer stating anonymously, "Unless someone complains about vandalism, we won't get involved. We don't go after it proactively."

In 1993, after several expensive cars in Singapore were spray-painted, the police arrested a student from the Singapore American School, Michael P. Fay, questioned him, and subsequently charged him with vandalism. Fay pleaded guilty to vandalizing a car in addition to stealing road signs. Under the 1966 Vandalism Act of Singapore, originally passed to curb the spread of communist graffiti in Singapore, the court sentenced him to four months in jail, a fine of S$3,500 (US$2,233), and a caning. The New York Times ran several editorials and op-eds that condemned the punishment and called on the American public to flood the Singaporean embassy with protests. Although the Singapore government received many calls for clemency, Fay's caning took place in Singapore on 5 May 1994. Fay had originally received a sentence of six strokes of the cane, but the presiding president of Singapore, Ong Teng Cheong, agreed to reduce his caning sentence to four lashes.

In South Korea, Park Jung-soo was fined two million South Korean won by the Seoul Central District Court for spray-painting a rat on posters of the G-20 Summit a few days before the event in November 2011. Park alleged that the initial in "G-20" sounds like the Korean word for "rat", but Korean government prosecutors alleged that Park was making a derogatory statement about the president of South Korea, Lee Myung-bak, the host of the summit. This case led to public outcry and debate on the lack of government tolerance and in support of freedom of expression. The court ruled that the painting, "an ominous creature like a rat" amounts to "an organized criminal activity" and upheld the fine while denying the prosecution's request for imprisonment for Park.

Europe 

In Europe, community cleaning squads have responded to graffiti, in some cases with reckless abandon, as when in 1992 in France a local Scout group, attempting to remove modern graffiti, damaged two prehistoric paintings of bison in the Cave of Mayrière supérieure near the French village of Bruniquel in Tarn-et-Garonne, earning them the 1992 Ig Nobel Prize in archeology.

In September 2006, the European Parliament directed the European Commission to create urban environment policies to prevent and eliminate dirt, litter, graffiti, animal excrement, and excessive noise from domestic and vehicular music systems in European cities, along with other concerns over urban life.

In Budapest, Hungary, both a city-backed movement called I Love Budapest and a special police division tackle the problem, including the provision of approved areas.

United Kingdom 

The Anti-Social Behaviour Act 2003 became Britain's latest anti-graffiti legislation. In August 2004, the Keep Britain Tidy campaign issued a press release calling for zero tolerance of graffiti and supporting proposals such as issuing "on the spot" fines to graffiti offenders and banning the sale of aerosol paint to anyone under the age of 16. The press release also condemned the use of graffiti images in advertising and in music videos, arguing that real-world experience of graffiti stood far removed from its often-portrayed "cool" or "edgy'" image.

To back the campaign, 123 Members of Parliament (MPs) (including then Prime Minister Tony Blair), signed a charter which stated: "Graffiti is not art, it's crime. On behalf of my constituents, I will do all I can to rid our community of this problem."

In the UK, city councils have the power to take action against the owner of any property that has been defaced under the Anti-social Behaviour Act 2003 (as amended by the Clean Neighbourhoods and Environment Act 2005) or, in certain cases, the Highways Act. This is often used against owners of property that are complacent in allowing protective boards to be defaced so long as the property is not damaged.

In July 2008, a conspiracy charge was used to convict graffitists for the first time. After a three-month police surveillance operation, nine members of the DPM crew were convicted of conspiracy to commit criminal damage costing at least £1 million. Five of them received prison sentences, ranging from eighteen months to two years. The unprecedented scale of the investigation and the severity of the sentences rekindled public debate over whether graffiti should be considered art or crime.

Some councils, like those of Stroud and Loerrach, provide approved areas in the town where graffitists can showcase their talents, including underpasses, car parks, and walls that might otherwise prove a target for the "spray and run".

Australia 

In an effort to reduce vandalism, many cities in Australia have designated walls or areas exclusively for use by graffitists. One early example is the "Graffiti Tunnel" located at the Camperdown Campus of the University of Sydney, which is available for use by any student at the university to tag, advertise, poster, and create "art". Advocates of this idea suggest that this discourages petty vandalism yet encourages artists to take their time and produce great art, without worry of being caught or arrested for vandalism or trespassing. Others disagree with this approach, arguing that the presence of legal graffiti walls does not demonstrably reduce illegal graffiti elsewhere. Some local government areas throughout Australia have introduced "anti-graffiti squads", who clean graffiti in the area, and such crews as BCW (Buffers Can't Win) have taken steps to keep one step ahead of local graffiti cleaners.

Many state governments have banned the sale or possession of spray paint to those under the age of 18 (age of majority). However, a number of local governments in Victoria have taken steps to recognize the cultural heritage value of some examples of graffiti, such as prominent political graffiti. Tough new graffiti laws have been introduced in Australia with fines of up to A$26,000 and two years in prison.

Melbourne is a prominent graffiti city of Australia with many of its lanes being tourist attractions, such as Hosier Lane in particular, a popular destination for photographers, wedding photography, and backdrops for corporate print advertising. The Lonely Planet travel guide cites Melbourne's street as a major attraction. All forms of graffiti, including sticker art, poster, stencil art, and wheatpasting, can be found in many places throughout the city. Prominent street art precincts include; Fitzroy, Collingwood, Northcote, Brunswick, St. Kilda, and the CBD, where stencil and sticker art is prominent. As one moves farther away from the city, mostly along suburban train lines, graffiti tags become more prominent. Many international artists such as Banksy have left their work in Melbourne and in early 2008 a perspex screen was installed to prevent a Banksy stencil art piece from being destroyed, it has survived since 2003 through the respect of local street artists avoiding posting over it, although it has recently had paint tipped over it.

New Zealand 

In February 2008 Helen Clark, the New Zealand prime minister at that time, announced a government crackdown on tagging and other forms of graffiti vandalism, describing it as a destructive crime representing an invasion of public and private property. New legislation subsequently adopted included a ban on the sale of paint spray cans to persons under 18 and increases in maximum fines for the offence from NZ$200 to NZ$2,000 or extended community service. The issue of tagging become a widely debated one following an incident in Auckland during January 2008 in which a middle-aged property owner stabbed one of two teenage taggers to death and was subsequently convicted of manslaughter.

United States

Tracker databases 

Graffiti databases have increased in the past decade because they allow vandalism incidents to be fully documented against an offender and help the police and prosecution charge and prosecute offenders for multiple counts of vandalism. They also provide law enforcement the ability to rapidly search for an offender's moniker or tag in a simple, effective, and comprehensive way. These systems can also help track costs of damage to a city to help allocate an anti-graffiti budget. The theory is that when an offender is caught putting up graffiti, they are not just charged with one count of vandalism; they can be held accountable for all the other damage for which they are responsible. This has two main benefits for law enforcement. One, it sends a signal to the offenders that their vandalism is being tracked. Two, a city can seek restitution from offenders for all the damage that they have committed, not merely a single incident. These systems give law enforcement personnel real-time, street-level intelligence that allows them not only to focus on the worst graffiti offenders and their damage, but also to monitor potential gang violence that is associated with the graffiti.

Gang injunctions 

Many restrictions of civil gang injunctions are designed to help address and protect the physical environment and limit graffiti. Provisions of gang injunctions include things such as restricting the possession of marker pens, spray paint cans, or other sharp objects capable of defacing private or public property; spray painting, or marking with marker pens, scratching, applying stickers, or otherwise applying graffiti on any public or private property, including, but not limited to the street, alley, residences, block walls, and fences, vehicles or any other real or personal property. Some injunctions contain wording that restricts damaging or vandalizing both public and private property, including but not limited to any vehicle, light fixture, door, fence, wall, gate, window, building, street sign, utility box, telephone box, tree, or power pole.

Hotlines and reward programs 

To help address many of these issues, many local jurisdictions have set up graffiti abatement hotlines, where citizens can call in and report vandalism and have it removed. San Diego's hotline receives more than 5,000 calls per year, in addition to reporting the graffiti, callers can learn more about prevention. One of the complaints about these hotlines is the response time; there is often a lag time between a property owner calling about the graffiti and its removal. The length of delay should be a consideration for any jurisdiction planning on operating a hotline. Local jurisdictions must convince the callers that their complaint of vandalism will be a priority and cleaned off right away. If the jurisdiction does not have the resources to respond to complaints in a timely manner, the value of the hotline diminishes. Crews must be able to respond to individual service calls made to the graffiti hotline as well as focus on cleanup near schools, parks, and major intersections and transit routes to have the biggest impact. Some cities offer a reward for information leading to the arrest and prosecution of suspects for tagging or graffiti related vandalism. The amount of the reward is based on the information provided, and the action taken.

Search warrants 

When police obtain search warrants in connection with a vandalism investigation, they are often seeking judicial approval to look for items such as cans of spray paint and nozzles from other kinds of aerosol sprays; etching tools, or other sharp or pointed objects, which could be used to etch or scratch glass and other hard surfaces; permanent marking pens, markers, or paint sticks; evidence of membership or affiliation with any gang or tagging crew; paraphernalia including any reference to "(tagger's name)"; any drawings, writing, objects, or graffiti depicting taggers' names, initials, logos, monikers, slogans, or any mention of tagging crew membership; and any newspaper clippings relating to graffiti crime.

Documentaries 

 80 Blocks from Tiffany's (1979): A rare glimpse into late 1970s New York toward the end of the infamous South Bronx gangs, the documentary shows many sides of the mainly Puerto Rican community of the South Bronx, including reformed gang members, current gang members, the police, and the community leaders who try to reach out to them.
 Stations of the Elevated (1980), the earliest documentary about subway graffiti in New York City, with music by Charles Mingus
 Style Wars (1983), an early documentary on hip hop culture, made in New York City
 Piece by Piece (2005), a feature-length documentary on the history of San Francisco graffiti from the early 1980s
 Infamy (2005), a feature-length documentary about graffiti culture as told through the experiences of six well-known graffiti writers and a graffiti buffer
 NEXT: A Primer on Urban Painting (2005), a documentary about global graffiti culture
 RASH (2005), a feature documentary about Melbourne, Australia and the artists who make it a living host for street art
 Jisoe (2007): A glimpse into the life of a Melbourne, Australia, graffiti writer shows the audience an example of graffiti in struggling Melbourne Areas.
 Roadsworth: Crossing the Line (2009), about Montréal artist Peter Gibson and his controversial stencil art on public roads
 Exit Through The Gift Shop (2010) was produced by the notorious artist Banksy. It tells the story of Thierry Guetta, a French immigrant in Los Angeles, and his obsession with street art; Shepard Fairey and Invader, whom Guetta discovers is his cousin, are also in the film.
 Still on and non the wiser (2011) is a ninety-minute-long documentation that accompanies the exhibition with the same name in the Kunsthalle Barmen of the Von der Heydt-Museum in Wuppertal (Germany). It draws vivid portrayals of the artists by means of very personal interviews and also catches the creation process of the works before the exhibition was opened.
 Graffiti Wars (2011), a documentary detailing King Robbo's feud with Banksy as well as the authorities' differing attitude towards graffiti and street art

Dramas 

 Wild Style (1983), about hip hop and graffiti culture in New York City
 Turk 182 (1985), about graffiti as political activism
 Bomb the System (2002), about a crew of graffitists in modern-day New York City
 Quality of Life (2004) was shot in the Mission District of San Francisco, co-written by and starring a retired graffiti writer.
 Wholetrain (2006), a German film

See also 

 Anti-graffiti coating
 BUGA UP
 Calligraffiti
 The Faith of Graffiti
 Grafedia
 Graffiti abatement
 Graffiti in the United Kingdom
 Graffiti post-2011 Egyptian Revolution
 Graffiti terminology
 Hobo sign
 Kilroy was here
 Kotwica
 Latrinalia
 List of graffiti and street art injuries and deaths
 Monsters of Art
 Philadelphia Mural Arts Program
 Roman graffiti
 Spray paint art
 Stencil Graffiti
 Street art
 Vandalism
 Visual pollution
 Yarn bombing

References

Further reading 

  
 Baird, J. A.; C. Taylor (eds.), 2011, Ancient Graffiti in Context. New York: Routledge.

External links 

 

 
Visual arts genres
Painting techniques
Street culture
Writing
Organized crime activity